The 2015 Quick Lane Bowl was a post-season college football bowl game between the Central Michigan Chippewas of the Mid-American Conference and the Minnesota Golden Gophers of the Big Ten Conference played on December 28, 2015, at Ford Field in Detroit, Michigan. It was the second edition of the Quick Lane Bowl. The game began at 5:00 p.m. EST and aired on ESPN2.

Although Minnesota finished with a below .500 record, they were allowed to participate in a bowl game after only 77 teams qualified for 80 available bowl spots. Minnesota was selected as one of three 5–7 teams to fill the final bowl spots due to their APR scores.

Game summary

Scoring summary

Statistics

References

External links
 Game summary at ESPN

Quick Lane Bowl
Quick Lane Bowl
Central Michigan Chippewas football bowl games
Minnesota Golden Gophers football bowl games
Quick Lane Bowl
December 2015 sports events in the United States